The Sport Flight Talon is a high-wing, pusher configuration single-engine, conventional landing gear homebuilt aircraft or ultralight aircraft, that was produced by Sport Flight Aviation of Sandy, Oregon in kit form for amateur construction.

The aircraft is no longer offered on the company website and seems to be out of production.

Design and development
The Talon was developed from the Maxair Drifter and introduced into the market in 1989. The aircraft shares the Drifter's main fuselage tube, used as the aircraft's spine. The rudder pedals attach to the front of the tube, the seat and wing support structure to the center and the tail to the rear of the tube. The main improvements over the original Drifter include strut-braced wings with jury struts, flaps, streamlined baggage area, optional enclosed cockpit, wheel pants and brakes. The addition of many options and extras over the basic Drifter design means that the Talon cannot be constructed in the US FAR 103 Ultralight Vehicles category, due to exceeding the maximum  category empty weight and must instead be registered as a homebuilt aircraft in the USA. In other countries, such as Canada, the Talon fits the ultralight or microlight aircraft category.

The aircraft's structure is made from 6061-T6 aluminum, with the main landing gear struts of 4130 steel. The aluminum frame wing is covered in pre-sewn Dacron envelopes. Construction time from the kit is reported as 120 hours.

The basic Talon design has been developed into a series of single and tandem two seaters, with varying powerplants.

Variants
Talon Magnum
Optional engines include the  Rotax 447, the  Rotax 503 and the  Rotax 582. Twenty had been constructed by December 2007.
Talon XP
Optional engines include the  Rotax 447, the  Rotax 503 and the  Rotax 582. Seventy had been constructed by December 2007.
Talon Super Magnum
This model is the XP model with the rear seat area converted into additional baggage space. Fits the FAI microlight class.
Talon Typhoon
Single seat aerobatic model.

Specifications (Talon XP)

See also

References

External links

Homebuilt aircraft
Single-engined pusher aircraft